The Point Pleasant School District is a comprehensive community public school district that serves students in pre-kindergarten through twelfth grade from Point Pleasant, in Ocean County, New Jersey, United States.

As of the 2019–20 school year, the district, comprised of four schools, had an enrollment of 2,842 students and 236.2 classroom teachers (on an FTE basis), for a student–teacher ratio of 12.0:1.

The district is classified by the New Jersey Department of Education as being in District Factor Group "FG", the fourth-highest of eight groupings. District Factor Groups organize districts statewide to allow comparison by common socioeconomic characteristics of the local districts. From lowest socioeconomic status to highest, the categories are A, B, CD, DE, FG, GH, I and J.

Schools
Schools in the district (with 2019–20 enrollment data from the National Center for Education Statistics) are:
Elementary schools
Nellie F. Bennett Elementary School with 764 students in grades PreK-5
James E. Karaba, Principal
Derek G. Hulse, Assistant Principal
Ocean Road School with 502 students in K-5
Sheila Buck, Principal
Lauren Rohmeyer, Assistant Principal
Middle school
Memorial Middle School with 675 students in 6-8
Gary A. Floyd, Principal
David Kirk, Assistant Principal
High school
Point Pleasant Borough High School with 871 students in grades 9-12
Kurt Karcich, Principal
Ed Kenney, Assistant Principal
Jacquelyn Zamarra, Assistant Principal

Administration
Core members of the district's administration are:
Adam L. Angelozzi, Superintendent
Steven W. Corso, Business Administrator / Board Secretary

Board of education

The district's board of education, comprised of seven members, sets policy and oversees the fiscal and educational operation of the district through its administration. As a Type II school district, the board's trustees are elected directly by voters to serve three-year terms of office on a staggered basis, with either two three seats up for election each year held (since 2012) as part of the November general election. The board appoints a superintendent to oversee the day-to-day operation of the district.

References

External links
Point Pleasant School District

School Data for the Point Pleasant School District, National Center for Education Statistics

Point Pleasant, New Jersey
New Jersey District Factor Group FG
School districts in Ocean County, New Jersey